The Oxford may refer to:

 The Oxford (Waltham, Massachusetts), listed on the NRHP in Massachusetts
The Oxford (Indianapolis, Indiana), listed on the NRHP in Indiana

See also
Oxford Historic District (disambiguation)